The Ward executive council was  executive council of British Ceylon. The government was led by Governor Henry George Ward.

Executive council members

See also
 Cabinet of Sri Lanka

Notes

References

1855 establishments in Ceylon
1860 disestablishments in Ceylon
Cabinets established in 1855
Cabinets disestablished in 1860
Ceylonese executive councils
Ministries of Queen Victoria